Podd is an educational game for the BBC Micro and Acorn Electron published by Acornsoft in 1984. The main character, Podd, teaches verbs, performing an appropriate animation when a recognised word is typed.

Gameplay
The object of the game is to find the 120 verbs that Podd recognizes.  Several words are mapped to one animation (e.g. "walk", "hike", "stroll", etc.), and children who realise this will be able to guess more words by thinking of synonyms for the words that have already been discovered.

External links
List of Podd's verbs at GiantBomb.com

1984 video games
Acornsoft games
BBC Micro and Acorn Electron games
BBC Micro and Acorn Electron-only games
Children's educational video games
Single-player video games
Video games developed in the United Kingdom